Ayatollah Ahmad Mojtahedi Tehrani (Persian: احمد مجتهدی تهرانی) was an Iranian Twelver Shia ayatollah/scholar who was born on 2 October 1923 in Tehran in a religious family. His father was Mohammad-Baqer, and his grandfather was Mirza-Ahmad (a religious trader); and his ancestors were among the Shia clerics and scholars of Kashan.

Mujtahedi Tehrani, became an Islamic cleric at the age of 19, and was working at the market (of the city) before that. Five years later, i.e. at the age of 24 he got married. Beside education, used to teach the books of Hawzah (to the students of Hawzah). This Shia scholar also established a Seminary by the help of religious traders/people. Finally, Mojtahedi Tehran died at the age of 85 on 13 January 2008 in Tehran.

Seminary school 

Mojtahedi Tehrani was the management of "Ayatollah Motahedi school", which was/is amongst the known Tehran Seminary-School. Among the graduated students of this seminary school are:
 Mostafa Chamran
 Mahmoud Ghandi
 Mohammad Javad Tondguyan
 Mohammad Boroujerdi
 Hassan Habibi
 Gholam-Ali Haddad-Adel
 Mohsen Kharazi
 Reza Ostadi
 Ali Akbar Mohtashamipur
 Ali Akbar Nategh-Nouri
 Mostafa Khamenei
 Mojtaba Khamenei
 Masoud Khamenei
 Meysam Khamenei
 Mohsen Kazeruni
 Seyed Mohammad Qaravi
 Mohammad Reza Naseri
 Mohammad Ali Fayaz Bakhsh

Teachers 
Mojtahedi Tehrani had teachers, such as:
 Ali Akbar Borhan
 Mohammad Javad Khandagh Abadi
 Seyed Morteza Alavi Fereiduni
 Seyed Mohammad Hossein Tabatabaei
 Abd  Al-Razzagh Isfahani
 Mohammad Sadughi
 Seyed Mohammad Sadegh Tabatabaee
 Seyed Shahab Al-Din Marashi Najafi
 Seyed Sadegh Shariat Madari
 Hossein Borujerdi
 Seyed Mohammad Reza Golpayegani
 Abbas Ali Shahrudi
 Mohammad Reza Tonekaboni
 Seyed Ahmad Khansari
 Seyed Ruhollah Khomaini
 Seyed Hossein Fatemi Qomi

References 

People from Tehran
Iranian ayatollahs
Iranian Muslim mystics
1923 births
2007 deaths